The Academy of the Holy Names in Tampa, Florida, is a Catholic, coeducational elementary school and a college preparatory high school for young women, sponsored by the Sisters of the Holy Names of Jesus and Mary. It is the oldest Catholic school on Florida's West Coast and the second oldest high school in the state.

Notable former students
 Juana Bordas, Nicaraguan–American community activist
 Argentina Díaz Lozano, Honduran journalist and novelist
 Kayleigh McEnany, former White House press secretary, political commentator, and writer
 Colleen Moore, silent film actress

References

External links
 

1881 establishments in Florida
Educational institutions established in 1881
Girls' schools in Florida
High schools in Tampa, Florida
Private K-12 schools in Florida
Catholic elementary schools in Florida
Catholic secondary schools in Florida
Roman Catholic Diocese of Saint Petersburg